General elections were held in Samoa on 31 March 2006 to determine the composition of the 14th Parliament. The main contesting parties were that of incumbent Prime Minister Tuilaepa Sailele Malielegaoi, of the Human Rights Protection Party (HRPP); and the Samoan Democratic United Party (SDUP). In addition, three other parties, the Christian Party (SCP), the Samoa Party (SP), and the Samoa Progressive Party (SPP), competed in the election. The result was a landslide victory for the HRPP, which won 33 of the 49 seats. The newly founded SDUP secured ten seats, and the remaining six were won by independents. After the election, three independents joined the HRPP, increasing the party's seat count to 36.

Background
During the previous Samoan general election in 2001, the incumbent HRPP won 23 seats but fell short of a majority to form a government. The opposition Samoan National Development Party (SNDP) won 13 seats, whilst the newly founded Samoan United People's Party secured a single seat, and independents won the rest. Le Mamea Ropati became the SNDP leader, following Tui Ātua Tupua Tamasese Efi's resignation. The HRPP was able to remain in power due to the support of independents.
Following the election, certain independents formed the Samoan United Independents party (SUIP). In December 2003, the SNDP and the SUIP merged to form the Samoan Democratic United Party, with Le Mamea Ropati as its leader and Asiata Sale'imoa Va'ai, previously leader of the SUIP, as deputy leader.

Electoral system

During the time of the 2006 election, Samoa's legislative assembly was composed of 49 seats, each serving a five-year term. 47 of the 49 members of parliament were elected from electoral constituencies, whilst the remaining two were elected through independent voters. Candidates were elected using First past the post voting.

Only Matai (chiefs) were permitted to contest any of the 47 constituencies, whilst the other two seats were open to all individuals. Once the final election results are confirmed, the leader of the majority party is appointed prime minister by the O le Ao o le Malo (head of state). The O le Ao o le Malo then appoints cabinet ministers on the advice of the prime minister.

Campaign

The incumbent HRPP government campaigned on the economy, specifically on the economic growth of five per cent, which occurred in 2005. The HRPP also promised to continue development projects if re-elected. The ruling party pledged to proceed with developing roads, schools and the overall education system and tourism by upgrading hotels and advances in agriculture, specifically in crops and livestock. The party also emphasised Cultural preservation and vowed to construct more sports venues for the upcoming South Pacific Games. Tuila'epa predicted the HRPP would secure a two-thirds majority.

The opposition SDUP, on the other hand, led by Le Mamea Ropati, a former HRPP cabinet minister, attacked the HRPP for its past corruption scandals and highlighted the high cost of living. The SDUP pledged to remove the Value Added Goods and Services Tax from essential food items, which they said was the cause of a price hike. Le Mamea claimed that the HRPP would increase the tax if re-elected. The SDUP also attacked the ruling party for causing the national doctors' strike. This strike arose after the HRPP government began to implement a 42% salary increase for civil servants, which was to occur in a series of phases over three years but declined to raise wages for individuals in the health care sector. The Samoan Medical Association was also outraged at the government for this action since they had proposed an increase for doctors in 2004. Despite the SDUP scrutinising the ruling party for the strike, these attacks did little to lower the HRPP's vote count at the ballot box.

The Samoan Christian Party was led into the election by Tuala Falenaoti Tiresa Malietoa, the first woman to lead a political party in Samoan history and the wife of the O le Ao o le Malo, Malietoa Tanumafili II. The Christian party, whose executives were solely composed of women, sought to promote development in all sectors of Samoan society. Tuala stated "...from the beginning of time, the Samoan women have been free and uninhibited in our own cultural organisation. We bring in a new perspective and a new and a fresh attitude to national governance and national development."

The Samoa Progressive Party ran a single candidate, former cabinet minister Toalepaiali'i Toesulusulu Siueva Pose II. Toalepaiali'i criticised the HRPP government for its focus on roads when exports had decreased, which he said had the potential to undermine the benefits of road development. The party campaigned on prioritising education and catering to the needs of citizens, particularly mental and physical development.

The Samoa Party (SP) was founded and led by former auditor-general Su'a Rimoni Ah Chong. He gained international attention as auditor-general after exposing widespread corruption within the HRPP government during the tenure of former prime minister Tofilau Eti Alesana. The party focused on government reform and anti-corruption and intended to establish free education, which Su'a said would fulfil compulsory education. The SP promised to combat corruption by implementing a two-term limit for the premiership and restoring the autonomy of watchdog institutions as part of a "good governance" agenda.

Opinion polling

Voting intention

Preferred prime minister

Conduct

In December 2005, Tuila'epa announced that the election would take place on 24 February 2006. However, Tuilaepa later delayed the election and changed the date several times before settling on 31 March 2006. SDUP leader Le Mamea Ropati criticised the government for the date modifications and questioned if they intended to have an election at all.

Prime minister Tuilaepa proposed in January 2006 the introduction of a residency requirement of at least three years to be eligible to vote, which only applied to candidates at the time. Le Mamea dismissed the proposal as a "ploy" to undermine Samoan voters in other countries, which he said primarily backed the SDUP. Tanuvasa Isitolo Lemisio, the electoral commissioner, later confirmed that the current law, which permitted citizens and dual citizens residing overseas to vote as long as they were registered, would remain intact.

Campaigning ceased at 6:30 pm on 30 March, and polling stations opened the following day at 9 am local time.

Results

Summary of Results

The HRPP secured 33 seats, while the SDUP won ten and independent candidates won six. However, results in the Fa'asalele'aga 3 constituency produced a tie between the top two candidates, incumbent member Unasa Mesi Galo of the HRPP and the SDUP's Tofa Eteuati Si'itia, both with 356 votes each. Unasa prevailed following a subsequent recount.

Results by constituency

Source:

Aftermath

Three independents decided to join the HRPP upon their electoral triumph, increasing the ruling party's seat share to 36.

Following the HRPP's victory, prime minister Tuilaepa promised to focus on the "well-being of the people". He expressed, "We have very little natural resources, so the yeoman asset is so important to us. We will concentrate on improving the education of our people as well as [their] health." Tuilaepa and deputy prime minister Misa Telefoni Retzlaff, were comfortably re-elected as leader and deputy leader of the HRPP respectively by the party caucus.

The results took the opposition SDUP by surprise, as polling earlier in 2006 predicted a comfortable victory for the party. Opposition leader Le Mamea announced that the party would assess how to proceed; the number of seats the party won was similar to that before the dissolution of the 13th Parliament. Le Mamea stated, "several weeks before the election we were right up at the top of the polls. Even myself as the preferred prime minister and the party as the ruling party. People needed a change. That is what I meant when I said we were very surprised. We did not anticipate this result."

The leader of the Samoa Progressive Party, Toalepaiali'i, blamed the opposition parties' losses on bribery on the part of the HRPP and claimed that prime minister Tuilaepa was knowledgeable about the matter. Tuilaepa denied these assertions and attributed his party's landslide victory to economic growth, as well as an alleged flawless record of improving the standard of living. He also stated that the opposition parties "had themselves to blame" for failing to attain more seats and said that the SDUP's attack strategy did not bode well for voters. Tuilaepa encouraged them to hold party conferences to analyse errors made in the election.

Ten candidates filed election petitions alleging various irregularities. Three of these were subsequently withdrawn, and five went to trial, of which three were eventually upheld.  Fa'asalele'aga No. 2 MP Pau Sefo Pau was deprived of his seat after being found guilty of four counts of bribery and one of treating.  The petitioner, Leanapapa Laki, was also convicted of ten counts of bribery.  In Aleipata Itupa-I-Lalo, Paepae Kapeli Su'a was found guilty of two counts of bribery, while the petitioner was found guilty of three counts of bribery and three of treating.  And in Fa'asalele'aga No. 4, Mulitalo Vui Siafausa was convicted of bribery after making a gift of fine mats to a village outside his constituency. The petitioner, Samoa Party leader Su'a Rimoni Ah Chong was also convicted of bribery for giving someone money and a television set.  All those convicted were deprived of their seats and barred from standing in the subsequent by-elections.

The parliamentary session was officially opened by the O le Ao o le Malo, Malietoa Tanumafili II, on 30 May 2006.

Notes

See also
List of members of the Legislative Assembly of Samoa (2006–2011)

References

Elections in Samoa
Samoa
General election
Election and referendum articles with incomplete results